Sharul Nazeem bin Zulpakar (born 16 November 1999) is a Malaysian professional footballer who plays as a centre-back for Malaysia Super League club Selangor and the Malaysia national team.

Club career

Early year

Sharul was born in Kuala Lumpur and grew up in Gombak, Selangor. He took his first steps in football to represent local club in third division league, Marcerra United in 2017. The following year, he joined Selangor youth team, and then promoted to the Selangor II, where he managed to play in the first team as a captain, and play all matches at 2020 Malaysia Premier League season, with help the team to reach the seventh-place (7th) in the league.

Selangor

Sharul was the part of the senior's team after being called by Selangor II team head coach, Michael Feichtenbeiner, to represent for 2020 Malaysia Cup tournament. On 2 December 2020, Selangor confirmed that Sharul would be definitely promoted to senior's first team for the 2021 season. He made his debut for the club on 6 April 2021, playing full 90-minutes with a 1–2 loss against Kedah Darul Aman in Super League matches. On 3 August 2021, Shahrul scored his first goal for the club against UiTM in 2–0 win at Super League matches.

International career

Youth
Sharul has represented Malaysia youth level from the under 19-side to the under-23 sides. He never makes any appearance during that time.

Senior

In October 2021, Sharul receives his first callup for senior team ahead of friendly against Jordan and Uzbekistan but he pulled up because of hamstring injury. On 10 March 2022, he received another callup for senior team from new appointed headcoach Kim Pan Gon ahead friendly matches against Philippines and Singapore. He however didn't make it into the finalised squad.

On 25 September 2022, Sharul made his debut for the national team in a penalty shoot-out defeat against Tajikistan in King's Cup final.

Career statistics

Club

International 
As of 10 January 2023

Honours
Selangor
 Malaysia Cup runner-up: 2022

References

External links
 

Living people
Malaysian footballers
Selangor FA players
Malaysia Premier League players
Malaysia Super League players
Malaysian people of Malay descent
People from Selangor
Association football forwards
1999 births